Ypsolopha nebulella is a moth of the family Ypsolophidae. It is known from Russia.

The wingspan is 17–18 mm.

References

External links
lepiforum.de

Ypsolophidae
Moths of Asia
Moths of Europe